The Biblioburro (The donkey library) is a traveling library that distributes books to patrons from the backs of two donkeys, Alfa and Beto. The program was created in La Gloria, Colombia, by Luis Soriano. The biblioburro operates within the central municipalities of the Department of Magdalena, on Colombia's Caribbean shore.

Soriano became fascinated with reading as a child and obtained a college degree in Spanish literature after studying with a professor who visited his village twice a month. A primary school teacher by profession, Soriano developed the idea after witnessing first-hand the power reading had on his students, most of whom had lived through intense life conflicts at a young age. Starting in the late 1990s, Soriano traveled to communities in Colombia's Caribbean Sea hinterlands with a portable library, which began with 70 books.

Soriano wrote to Juan Gossaín, a Colombian journalist and writer, after having heard him read excerpts from his novel The Ballad of Maria Abdala on a radio program. Soriano asked Gossaín for a copy of his book to be distributed on the Biblioburro, details that Gossaín broadcast on his radio program. The response created a flood of book donations and Soriano's collection soon expanded to 4,800 volumes. As of November 2009, a library building next to Soriano's house has been completed funded in part by donations from the public, and it opened as the first library in La Gloria.

Children's adventure stories have remained one of the most popular items distributed by the Biblioburros. In addition to encyclopedia volumes, novels, and medical texts, other items distributed by the Biblioburro include Horacio Quiroga's animal fable Anaconda, the Dictionary of the Spanish Language of the Royal Spanish Academy (Diccionario de la lengua española de la Real Academia Española) and a number of Time–Life travel pictorial books. Books lost from the collection include a sex education manual and a copy of Laura Esquivel's 1989 novel Like Water for Chocolate, both of which were not returned by borrowers. A copy of Paulo Coelho's 1990 novel Brida was stolen by bandits, who tied up Soriano after attempting to rob him and discovered he had no money.

Colombian documentary filmmaker Carlos Rendón Zipagauta has made a film that tells the story of Soriano and the Biblioburros.

In June 2012, Soriano had a leg amputated after an accident involving one of his burros, but as of January 2013 he continued committed to his work.

See also 
 Pack Horse Library Project
 Warrington Perambulating Library
 Bookmobile

References

External links
Ayoka short film
Biblioburro blog
Biblioburro Rocketboom Video

PBS POV: Biblioburro Documentary and lesson plans

Colombian culture
Libraries in Colombia
Mobile libraries
Donkeys